Phronesis is a peer-reviewed academic journal covering the study of ancient philosophy. It is indexed by PhilPapers and the Philosopher's Index. The journal was established in 1955 by Donald James Allan and Joseph Bright Skemp, who wrote in the first issue that the goal of the journal was to bring together philosophers and classicists from across national borders so as to improve the specialty of ancient philosophy, but also to include insights for those in medieval studies. Phronesis has been described as "pioneering" and one of the major English-language journals for ancient philosophy. The journal is published by Brill Publishers and the editors-in-chief are Thomas Kjeller Johansen (University of Oslo) and Alexander Long (University of St Andrews).

References

External links 
 
 PhilPapers listing for Phronesis

Ancient philosophy journals
Publications established in 1955
Brill Publishers academic journals
Quarterly journals
English-language journals